Sury-en-Vaux is a commune in the Cher department in the Centre-Val de Loire region of France.

Geography
It is one of the communes permitted to grow grapes for Sancerre AOC wine.

Population

Sights
 The church of St. Etienne, dating from the nineteenth century.

Personalities
The English poet, author and biographer Richard Aldington lived in Sury-en-Vaux from 1958 until his death in 1962. He is buried in the local cemetery.

See also
Communes of the Cher department

References

Communes of Cher (department)